Tim Commerford (born February 26, 1968) is an American musician, best known as the bassist and backing vocalist for rock band Rage Against the Machine, and supergroups Audioslave and Prophets of Rage. Since 2013 and 2015, he has also been the lead singer and bassist of the bands Future User and Wakrat.

He was ranked eighth on Paste magazine's list of "20 Underrated Bass Guitarists" in 2014.

Early life
Commerford was born on February 26, 1968, in Irvine, California. Growing up, his musical idols were Gene Simmons, Sid Vicious, Steve Harris, and Geddy Lee.

Career

Rage Against the Machine (1991–2000)

In 1991, following the break-up of the band Lock Up featuring guitarist Tom Morello, the band's drummer, Jon Knox, encouraged Commerford and Zack de la Rocha to jam with Tom Morello. Tom soon called Brad Wilk, who had unsuccessfully auditioned for Lock Up. This line-up went on to form Rage Against the Machine. After frequenting the L.A. club circuit, Rage Against the Machine signed a record deal with Epic Records in 1992. That same year, the band released their self-titled debut. They achieved a phenomenal amount of mainstream success and released three more studio albums.

Commerford's appearances on Rage Against the Machine's studio records have been marked with a running joke where his credits on the record were under humorous nicknames, such as "Y Tim K" or "Tim.com".

In late 2000, after Commerford's stunt at the VMA's, a disgruntled de la Rocha quit the band. On September 13, 2000, Rage Against the Machine performed their last concert at the Grand Olympic Auditorium in Los Angeles.

Audioslave (2001–2007)

After Zack de la Rocha left Rage Against the Machine, music producer Rick Rubin suggested the three remaining members of Rage get together with then-former Soundgarden singer Chris Cornell, and "see what happens".

By May 2001, they had begun to work in the studio, writing their first song "Light My Way". By April 2002, the newly formed band had split due to "outside" pressures, mainly from management companies. They soon got back together though, and on November 19, 2002, they released their eponymous debut, which would attain triple platinum status. Audioslave attained a large amount of success, and released another two studio albums. On May 5, 2005, Audioslave played a free concert in front of 65,000 Cuban fans, becoming the first American rock band to play a concert within Cuba.

On February 15, 2007, Chris Cornell officially announced his departure from Audioslave, thus disbanding the group.

Rage Against the Machine reunion (2007–2011)

On April 29, 2007, Rage Against the Machine reunited at the Coachella Music Festival. The band played in front of an EZLN backdrop to the largest crowd of the festival. The performance was first thought to be a one-off, but this turned out not to be the case. The band played seven more shows in the United States in 2007 (including their first non-festival concert in seven years at the Alpine Valley Music Theater in East Troy, Wisconsin), and in January 2008, they played their first shows outside the US as part of the Big Day Out Festival in Australia and New Zealand, and then played at the T in the Park festival in Scotland and at the Reading and Leeds festival in England in the summer of 2008.

The band continued to tour around the world, headlining many large festivals in Europe and the United States, including Lollapalooza in Chicago. In 2008 the band also played shows in Denver, Colorado and St. Paul, Minnesota, the locations of the Democratic National Convention and Republican National Convention, respectively. Their most recent performance was in 2011, at The Coliseum at Los Angeles.

Future User, Wakrat and 7D7D (2014–present)
Commerford co-founded provocative band Future User, together with Jordan Tarlow (keys), Jon Knox (drums) and producer Brendan O'Brien (guitars). He plays bass and is the vocalist of the band. Tim Commerford hid several months under the S.W.I.M persona on the first music videos, before unmasking himself in the "Mountain Lion" video. In the band's first video, tennis player John McEnroe subjected himself to waterboarding. The "Mountain Lion" video featured road racing cyclist Lance Armstrong, a close friend of Commerford, while a skateboarding Commerford appears to inject himself with a steroid.

In 2015, he formed "punk and hardcore-influenced band", named Wakrat. The band also features drummer Mathias Wakrat and guitarist Laurent Grangeon. The band debuted their first single, "Knucklehead", in September 2015.

In 2022, Tim Commerford launched a new project, 7D7D, with Mathias Wakrat and Jonny Polonsky. The group debuted their first single, "Capitalism", in November.

Prophets of Rage (2016–2019)
In 2016, Tim Commerford reunited with Tom Morello and Brad Wilk, and was joined by Chuck D and B-Real to form supergroup Prophets of Rage. They play covers from their Rage Against the Machine, Public Enemy and Cypress Hill material, and new material as well.

Other contributions
Commerford and drummer Brad Wilk contributed to Maynard James Keenan's side project Puscifer and his album "V" Is for Vagina on the track "Momma Sed". Both have taken part in the production of Dave Grohl's 2013 Sound City soundtrack, with the track "Time Slowing Down". In 2010, Commerford was interviewed and appeared in the documentary Rush: Beyond the Lighted Stage.

Personal life 
In 2001, Commerford married his longtime girlfriend, Aleece Dimas. They have two sons together, Xavier and Quentin. In November 2018, the couple announced they were divorcing.

Commerford is a self-described "conspiracy theorist". In a Rolling Stone interview in 2015, he claimed that the Moon landing was faked and he confronted Buzz Aldrin about it at a John Cusack movie premiere. In the same interview, Commerford also stated that he doesn't believe ISIS is real and cast doubt upon the ISIS beheading videos:

In December 2022, Commerford revealed he had been diagnosed with prostate cancer.

Equipment
Commerford's has been using various Music Man StingRay basses since 2016, a brand he likes since his beginnings with Rage Against The Machine. MusicMan released several custom Artist Series basses in 2021. He previously used Fender Jazz Basses with Fender Precision Bass necks and Lakland basses.

Discography

Rage Against the Machine

 Rage Against the Machine (1992)
 Evil Empire (1996)
 Live & Rare (1998)
 The Battle of Los Angeles (1999)
 Renegades (2000)
 Live at the Grand Olympic Auditorium (2003)

Audioslave

 Audioslave (2002)
 Out of Exile (2005)
 Revelations (2006)

Future User
 SteroidsOrHeroin (2015)

Wakrat
 Wakrat (2016)

Prophets of Rage
 Prophets of Rage (2017)

References

External links

 
 Official Facebook page

1968 births
American people of French descent
American people of Irish descent
Guitarists from Los Angeles
California socialists
American heavy metal bass guitarists
American male bass guitarists
Rage Against the Machine members
Audioslave members
People from Irvine, California
Alternative metal bass guitarists
Living people
American anti-fascists
Moon landing conspiracy theorists
American conspiracy theorists
Grammy Award winners
Prophets of Rage members
20th-century American bass guitarists
21st-century American bass guitarists